Aaron Dawson (born 24 March 1992) is an English footballer who plays as a defender or midfielder for Vauxhall Motors.

Career
Dawson started his career in the youth team of Exeter City and signed his first professional contract in May 2010 after completing his two-year scholarship.

In September 2011, Dawson joined Southern League side Tiverton Town on a four-month loan.

He made his professional debut for Exeter City on 25 February 2012, in a 2–0 defeat to Huddersfield Town at the Galpharm Stadium.

Dawson signed for Torquay United on 26 January 2015 following his release by Exeter City.

References

External links

1992 births
Living people
English footballers
Footballers from Devon
People from Exmouth
Association football midfielders
Exeter City F.C. players
Tiverton Town F.C. players
Havant & Waterlooville F.C. players
Farnborough F.C. players
English Football League players
National League (English football) players
Truro City F.C. players
Torquay United F.C. players